Enrico Lazzarotto (born 14 January 1973 in Bassano del Grappa) is an Italian slalom canoeist who competed from the early 1990s to the mid-2000s.

He won a gold medal in the K1 team event at the 2000 European Championships in Mezzana.

He finished 14th in the K1 event at the 2000 Summer Olympics in Sydney.

World Cup individual podiums

References

Sports-Reference.com profile

1973 births
Canoeists at the 2000 Summer Olympics
Italian male canoeists
Living people
Olympic canoeists of Italy
20th-century Italian people